The Bundermann Range is a small mountain range located immediately north of Nupskammen Ridge and Terningskarvet Mountain in the Gjelsvik Mountains of Queen Maud Land.  The name Bundermannketten was applied to a range of mountains in this area by the Third German Antarctic Expedition (1938–39) under Alfred Ritscher.  The correlation of the name with this feature may be arbitrary, but is recommended for the sake of international uniformity and historical continuity.  It was named for Max Bundermann, aerial photographer on the Passat, one of the flying boats used by the German expedition.

References
 

Mountain ranges of Queen Maud Land
Princess Martha Coast